Carl Fischer Music (founded in 1872) is a sheet music publisher originally located in the East Village neighborhood of New York City. In 2013, the company moved to the Wall Street area. The family-owned business publishes both performance and educational music for students, teachers, and virtuosos. Carl Fischer's composers and editors give clinics and sessions nationally. The company claims to serve more than 2000 retailers around the world.

History

1870s into the 20th century
In 1872, Carl Fischer opened his musical instrument repair shop in the East Village neighborhood of New York City. Noticing that many of his customers were searching for instrumental arrangements of well-known works that didn't exist, Fischer began creating and reproducing arrangements which led him into the music publishing business. Carl Fischer became the pre-eminent publisher of music for concert band composers such as Percy Grainger, John Philip Sousa and the transcriptions of Erik W. G. Leidzén and Mayhew Lake.

Carl Fischer was also a musical instrument dealer and imported wooden flutes made by Emil Rittershausen and Berlin, Germany from the 1890s to 1914.  During this early period Carl Fisher was also the sole U.S. agent for Besson instruments, but also imported stenciled brass instruments from Courtois, Alexander, and Bohland & Fuchs. In 1910 Fischer won the importation rights for woodwinds manufactured by Buffet-Crampon of France. In 1929 the C.G. Conn Ltd. corporation acquired the musical instrument department from the company, maintaining the Carl Fischer retail operations as a consortium between Conn and the music publisher under the Carl Fischer name.  Instruments from various manufacturers of the period were sold under the Carl Fischer house brand.

As the company grew and diversified, Fischer's three sons joined the team: Carl, Jr., Walter S. and George. In 1924, Carl Fischer Music was invited to be a member of ASCAP, adding the company's publications to an established network of artists and composers. The company continued to grow, necessitating the building of Carl Fischer's new headquarters in 1926, located in Cooper Square, Manhattan. This building housed administrative offices and a retail store.

1930s and 1940s
Walter S. Fischer succeeded his father as President of Carl Fischer Music in 1923 and in 1939 his son-in-law, Frank Hayden Connor became his assistant.
Though they began contributing in the 1920s, it was the 1930s and 1940s that were marked by the significant contributions of works and arrangements from well-established classical music figures such as Mischa Elman, Jascha Heifetz, and Joseph Szigeti.  The company also holds copyright to The U.S. Air Force Song. Frank Hayden Connor became the president of the company and opened Carl Fischer's second retail location, which also housed a concert hall at 165 West 57th Street in midtown Manhattan. This five-story building was the largest music store in New York City until it was sold in 1959.  In 1940 the company acquired the York Band Instrument Company for $300,000.  Production at the York facility was switched over to munitions during World War II, after which the York brand subsequently downscaled their production to budget lines of instruments provided by various suppliers.

1950s through the 1970s
Notable additions to the catalog during the 1950s, 1960s and 1970s include significant works by Howard Hanson, Norman Dello Joio, Lukas Foss, Peter Mennin, Douglas Moore, and Anton Webern.
During this period, Carl Fischer Music represented Oxford University Press, Paterson's of London, Henle Verlag of Germany, Cundy-Bettoney, Eastman School of Music (containing music by then-director Howard Hanson), the Fillmore Music catalog (containing Henry Fillmore's marches), and the Charles Foley catalog (containing the compositions of Fritz Kreisler).

1980s and 1990s
Walter Fischer Connor became president and chairman of the board, as well as chairman of Boosey and Hawkes, a British music publishing company, for a short time. During this time, Carl Fischer Music developed the Rack Sense program, the first sophisticated computerized system for stocking music stores with high-turnover print music product. Composer Andrew Balent created the Sounds Spectacular series for band, a forerunner in the area of music for young bands. It was also during this period that Carl Fischer Music began to publish the works of fast-rising composers such as Henry Brant, Michael Colgrass, Sebastian Currier, Jason Eckardt, Daron Hagen, Lee Hyla, Martin Bresnick, David Carlson, Paul Lansky, Daniel S. Godfrey, Samuel Jones, and David Maslanka. In 1999,  F. Hayden Connor, the great-grandson of founder Carl Fischer, became chairman, and music publishing icon Sandy Feldstein was hired to lead the firm into the 21st century. Carl Fischer Music moved its corporate headquarters to the landmark Bayard-Condict Building in the NoHo neighborhood of Greenwich Village.

2000s - present day
The 2000s began with the launch of the Performance Series for school concert band and string orchestra, featuring original works and arrangements, organized by grade level for directors’ ease of use. In 2008, BriLee Music joined the Carl Fischer choral catalog.

Carl Fischer Music also continues to release enhanced editions of essential methods such as the Wohlfahrt Violin Studies, the Rose Studies for Flute and Clarinet, and many others.
Former TMEA president and active educator Denise Eaton joined the editorial team in 2011 as choral editor.

Carl Fischer Music is under the leadership of CEO Sonya Kim.
In 2013 the Carl Fischer Music administrative offices moved to 48 Wall Street.

References

List of composers for Carl Fischer Music
News and Events for Carl Fischer Music

Sheet music publishing companies
Music publishing companies of the United States
Publishing companies established in 1872
Family-owned companies of the United States